The following is a list of episodes for the second season of BN Pictures' Aikatsu Friends! television series, Aikatsu Friends! Brilliant Jewel, which aired on TV Tokyo from April 4, 2019 to September 26, 2019.

Episode list

References

Aikatsu!
Aikatsu! episode lists
2019 Japanese television seasons